Pterostylis diminuta, commonly known as the small-flowered leafy greenhood,  is a plant in the orchid family Orchidaceae and is endemic to Victoria. As with similar greenhoods, the flowering plants differ from those that are not flowering. The non-flowering plants have a rosette  of leaves flat on the ground but the flowering plants have up to twelve small, partly green, partly translucent flowers and lack a rosette.

Description
Pterostylis diminuta, is a terrestrial,  perennial, deciduous, herb with an underground tuber. The dorsal sepal and petals are joined to form a hood called the "galea" over the column. The galea is dark green with translucent "windows" and a brownish, tapered tip. Flowering occurs from September to November.

Taxonomy and naming
The small-flowered leafy greenhood was first formally described in 2006 by David Jones and Mark Clements and given the name Bunochilus diminutus. The description was published in Australian Orchid Research from a specimen collected in the Deep Lead Reserve near Stawell. In 2007, Gary Backhouse changed the name to Pterostylis diminuta. The specific epithet (diminuta) is from "the Latin diminutus, diminished, made small, in reference to the smaller flowers and floral parts of this species when compared with B. melagrammus" (Pterostylis melagramma).

Distribution and habitat
Pterostylis diminuta occurs in grassy or shrubby woodland and forest between Ballarat and the Grampians in Victoria.

References

External links
 

diminuta
Endemic orchids of Australia
Orchids of Victoria (Australia)
Plants described in 2006